The Locharnini are a tribe of tussock moths of the family Erebidae. The tribe was erected by Jeremy Daniel Holloway and Houshuai Wang in 2015.

Genera
Based on Wang, H. et al.:

References

Lymantriinae
Moth tribes